Josephine Diane Shirley Gibson (born 24 January 1985) is an English television personality and presenter. In 2010, she won the eleventh series of Big Brother, and later that year, she appeared in Ultimate Big Brother. She was also a regular guest host on the Channel 5 magazine series OK! TV. Since 2019, Gibson has been a regular segment presenter and announcer for This Morning. She  also regularly guest presents the show.

Career
In 2010, Gibson entered the Big Brother house. Throughout her stay, she received five nominations for eviction, and never faced the public vote. She entered into a romantic relationship with fellow housemate John James Parton and upon leaving Big Brother, the couple confirmed that they were dating. On Day 66 of Big Brother 11, Josie was selected by the other housemates to receive a ticket to the final. On Day 77 of Big Brother 11, she was announced as the winner with 77.5% of the public vote; the highest percentage out of any other Big Brother series.

After an interview with Davina McCall, she confirmed she was going to take part in Ultimate Big Brother, then re-entered the Big Brother house 18 minutes later. On Day 3 of Ultimate Big Brother, Gibson walked out of the house, while other housemates were nominating. It was confirmed that she was not returning to the Ultimate Big Brother house. She was reunited with Parton seconds after breaking out, as he was at the Big Brother compound recording a message for her. Her fellow housemates shared their sadness after her exit, with Ulrika Jonsson crying and eventual winner Brian Dowling predicting that she would have won if she had stayed.

In October 2010, she and John James Parton appeared in a one-off fly on the wall show following their lives together called Josie and John James: What Happened Next. In May 2011, she appeared in three-part reality TV series There's Something About Josie. Also in 2011, she split up with John James Parton.

Presenting and other projects

In early 2011, Gibson released a perfume called 'Josie'. She also released limited edition hoodie tops on her official website. She also became a spokesmodel for Curvissa Clothing. She did an implied nude photoshoot in August 2011. Gibson also wrote a regular column for Now magazine.

Gibson was a showbiz reporter for Channel 5 show OK! TV. She appeared on the series on Thursdays, and presented from the first episode in January 2011. She also guest presented the series when Jenny Frost was away. OK! TV ended on 16 December 2011. She was also a reporter for Big Brother's Bit On The Side from August to November 2011.

Gibson was a weekly animal reporter for Channel 5's Live With.... She appeared first on 8 March 2012, and was a regular feature on the show and appeared once every week. Beginning in April 2012, Gibson wrote a column in Now magazine called "Just Josie".

Gibson has appeared on numerous television series, such as: Celebrity Wedding Planner, Celebrity Impossible, Let's do Lunch with Gino & Mel, The Wright Stuff, Silent Library, Wagons Den, Celebrity Juice, Live from Studio Five, The Vanessa Show, OK! TV, Big Brother's Bit on the Side, Live with..., This Morning and Loose Women, as well as having her own reality shows John James and Josie: What happened Next and There's Something About Josie.

In January 2013, Josie became the official new face of Pearlys, a UK nationwide cosmetic teeth whitening company. Later that month, she released a workout DVD called Josie Gibson: 30 Second Slim.

In 2016, aged 30 Josie Gibson appeared on the Celebrity version of Dinner Date, in which she went for meals at three men's houses and choose one for a second date with Jack, at the time she was single, one of them recognised her slim frame and face from Big Brother.

In February 2017, she appeared as contestant on The Jump, but was the first celebrity eliminated after refusing to take part in the live ski jump. It was announced shortly after her departure from The Jump that she would be present a new dating show called Getting Jiggy With Josie, to air later in the year on Made TV.

In 2019 Gibson joined This Morning as a competition announcer. On 16 November 2021 she became a presenter on the show, filling in last minute for Holly Willoughby. It was subsequently confirmed that she would present the series as holiday cover.

In October 2022 Gibson appeared as a panelist on Channel 4's The Great British Bake Off: An Extra Slice.

Filmography

Guest appearances
Gibson has appeared on The Vanessa Show, Loose Women, Celebrity Juice, Let's Do Lunch with Gino & Mel, Live From Studio Five and The Wright Stuff. She also appeared on Big Brother spin-off shows Big Brother's Little Brother, Big Brother's Big Mouth, and Silent Library. Gibson has also appeared on the show Celebrity Wedding Planner on Channel 5 in January 2012 and Celebrity Dinner Date (Series 5 Episode 10) in January 2016.

Personal life
Daughter of Mandy Gibson, Josie is the eldest of three brothers and three sisters. She is originally from Bristol and attended Brimsham Green School in Yate. Gibson donated £20,000 of her winnings to CLIC Sargent when she left Big Brother. She has struggled with her weight over the years and in 2013 she released a fitness DVD. In September 2018, she gave birth to her son, Reggie-James.

References

Living people
Big Brother (British TV series) winners
Television personalities from Bristol
1985 births